Carlisle Independent School District is a public school district based in the community of Price, Texas (USA).

The district is located in west central Rusk County and extends into a small portion of Cherokee County.

Carlisle ISD has one school that serves students in grades Pre-K though twelve.

In 2009, the school district was rated "academically acceptable" by the Texas Education Agency.

References

External links
Carlisle ISD

School districts in Rusk County, Texas
School districts in Cherokee County, Texas